Didsbury East is an area and electoral ward of Manchester, England. It is represented in Westminster by Jeff Smith MP for Manchester Withington. The 2011 Census recorded a population of 14,333.

Councillors 
Three councillors serve the ward: James Wilson (Lab), Linda Foley (Lab), and Andrew Simcock (Lab)

 indicates seat up for re-election.

Elections in 2020s 
* indicates incumbent councillor seeking re-election.

May 2021

Elections in 2010s

May 2019

May 2018

May 2016

May 2015

May 2014

May 2012

May 2011

May 2010

Elections in 2000s

References 

Didsbury
Manchester City Council Wards